Yann Motta Pinto  (born 24 November 1999) is a Brazilian professional footballer who plays as a centre-back.

Career

Tanjong Pagar United 
Motta joined Tanjong Pagar United from Sampaio Corrêa in February 2020, and on 6 March, scored on his debut in the Singapore Premier League.

Persija Jakarta 
It was reported on 16 Dec 2020 that he will move to Indonesia club, Persija Jakarta, for the new season. This season was suspended on 27 March 2020 due to the COVID-19 pandemic. The season was abandoned and was declared void on 20 January 2021.

He made his league debut on 5 September by starting in a 1–1 draw against PSS Sleman, and he also scored his first goal for Persija in the 16th minute.

Career statistics

Club

Notes

Honours

Club

Persija Jakarta
Menpora Cup: 2021

References

1999 births
Living people
Association football defenders
Singapore Premier League players
Liga 1 (Indonesia) players
Tanjong Pagar United FC players
Persija Jakarta players
Expatriate footballers in Singapore
Expatriate footballers in Indonesia
Brazilian footballers
Brazilian expatriate footballers
Brazilian expatriate sportspeople in Singapore
Brazilian expatriate sportspeople in Indonesia
People from São Gonçalo, Rio de Janeiro
Sportspeople from Rio de Janeiro (state)